Events from the year 1824 in Ireland.

Events
19 November – Edward Kernan appointed Roman Catholic Bishop of Clogher, in succession to James Murphy, an office he will hold until 1844.
Foundation of the Northern Banking Company.
The Ordnance Survey of Ireland is established.
The U.K. Weights and Measures Act legally abolishes use of the Irish mile for most official purposes.
The Shelbourne Hotel is established on St Stephen's Green, Dublin, by Martin Burke.
Northern Whig newspaper is founded in Belfast.
Thomas Crofton Croker publishes his first study of Irish folklore, Researches in the South of Ireland.

Births
23 April – William Nash, soldier, recipient of the Victoria Cross for gallantry in 1858 at Lucknow, India (died 1875).
28 May – Thomas Croke, Roman Catholic Archbishop of Cashel and Emly, founder patron of the Gaelic Athletic Association (died 1902).
26 June – William Thomson, 1st Baron Kelvin, mathematical physicist, engineer, and leader in the physical sciences (died 1907).
August – Thomas Laughnan, soldier, recipient of the Victoria Cross for gallantry in 1857 at Lucknow, India (died 1864).
1 December – Thomas Henry Fitzgerald, farmer and politician in Queensland, Australia (died 1888).
12 December – William Joseph Corbet, nationalist politician and MP (died 1909).
Full date unknown
John Coghlan, public works engineer in Argentina (died 1890).
Patrick Green, soldier, recipient of the Victoria Cross for gallantry in 1857 at Delhi, India (died 1889).
John O'Hart, genealogist (died 1902).
Charles Irwin, soldier, recipient of the Victoria Cross for gallantry in 1857 at Lucknow, India (died 1873).
John Lyons, soldier, recipient of the Victoria Cross for gallantry in 1855 at the siege of Sevastopol in the Crimean War (died 1867).
Edward Whelan, politician, one of the Fathers of the Canadian Confederation (died 1867).

Deaths
21 January – Charles MacCarthy, soldier in the French, Dutch and British armies, governor of various British territories in West Africa (born 1764).
17 April – William Ashford, landscape painter (born 1746 in England).
16 June – Walter Thom, journalist (born 1770 in Scotland).
24 August – Valentine Quin, 1st Earl of Dunraven and Mount-Earl, peer (born 1752).
30 October – Charles Maturin, clergyman, novelist and playwright (born 1782).
9 November – Richard Annesley, 2nd Earl Annesley, politician (born 1745).
19 November – Bishop James Murphy, Bishop of Clogher 1801–1824 (born 1744).
5 December – Thomas McCord, businessman and politician in Lower Canada (born 1750).

References

 
Years of the 19th century in Ireland
1820s in Ireland
Ireland
 Ireland